Sociosa macrographa is a species of moth of the family Tortricidae. It is found in Myanmar.

References

Moths described in 1951
Polyorthini